Jeon Ye-seo (born July 26, 1981) is a South Korean actress.

Filmography

Television series

Film

Awards and nominations

References

External links 
 
 
 Jeon Ye-seo Fan Cafe at Daum 
 
 
 
 
 Jeon Ik-ryung on Daum 
 Jeon Ik-ryung on Naver Movies 

1981 births
Living people
South Korean film actresses
South Korean television actresses
Chung-Ang University alumni